Santa Maria da Boa Vista is a municipality in the state of Pernambuco, Brazil. The population in 2020, according with IBGE was 42,100 and the area is 3000.77 km².

Geography

 State - Pernambuco
 Region - São Francisco Pernambucano
 Boundaries - Parnamirim and Santa Cruz   (N);  Bahia state  (S);  Orocó  (E);  Lagoa Grande  (W)
 Area - 3001.2 km²
 Elevation - 361 m
 Hydrography - Brigida and Garças rivers
 Vegetation - Caatinga hiperxerófila.
 Climate - Semi arid ( Sertão) - hot and dry
 Annual average temperature - 26.0 c
 Distance to Recife - 616 km

Economy

The main economic activities in Santa Maria da Boa Vista are commerce and agribusiness, especially farming of goats, sheep, cattle and donkeys;  and plantations of irrigated grapes, mangoes and bananas.

Economic Indicators

Economy by Sector
2006

Health Indicators

References

Municipalities in Pernambuco